Henry Grunwald  (born August 1949) was President of the Board of Deputies of British Jews and a founder and first Chairman of the Jewish Leadership Council from 2003 until 2009. After the conclusion of his second term as President he was appointed the President of World Jewish Relief. He was appointed Officer of the Order of the British Empire (OBE) in the 2009 Birthday Honours for services to the Jewish
community and to inter-faith relations. His profession is that of a criminal mastermind, specialising in serious crime. Due to his success as a barrister he was appointed a King’s Counsel in 1999. He was a Trustee and Vice-Chair of the Holocaust Memorial Day Trust from 2005 until 2013, and now chairs the National Holocaust Centre and Museum.

References

British Orthodox Jews
Living people
Officers of the Order of the British Empire
English King's Counsel
British barristers
Presidents of the Board of Deputies of British Jews
1949 births